Borborema Potiguar is a microregion in the Brazilian state of Rio Grande do Norte.

Municipalities 
The microregion consists of the following municipalities:
 Barcelona
 Campo Redondo
 Coronel Ezequiel
 Jaçanã
 Japi
 Lagoa de Velhos
 Lajes Pintadas
 Monte das Gameleiras
 Ruy Barbosa
 Santa Cruz
 São Bento do Trairi
 São José do Campestre
 São Tomé
 Serra de São Bento
 Sítio Novo
 Tangará

References

Microregions of Rio Grande do Norte